Salvia disermas is a herbaceous perennial shrub native to South Africa (the Cape Provinces, the Free State and the Northern Provinces), found in streambeds, moist forest, grassland, and disturbed ground. It was originally specified as rugosa, but was changed to disermas. It grows throughout west Africa, with its greatest concentration in South Africa, where it is used medicinally as a tea, and as a lotion for treating sores.

The individual flowers are not showy, but the plant blooms profusely, and is rarely out of bloom. The long narrow leaves are pale apple-green with a fragrance similar to hay.

Notes

disermas
Flora of the Cape Provinces
Flora of the Free State
Flora of the Northern Provinces